Mark Landon (October 1, 1948 – May 11, 2009) was an American actor, and son of Bonanza and Little House on the Prairie star Michael Landon.

Life and career
Mark Fraser Landon was adopted in 1956, aged 8, by the 20-year-old actor Michael Landon. Mark's biological mother was Michael's then wife, Dodie Levy-Fraser.

Mark Landon appeared in three movies, including the CBS television movie Us (1991), which was written and directed by Michael Landon shortly before his death in 1991. It aired a few months after Michael Landon died. Mark also had a small role as a Navy SEAL in the 1997 movie Goodbye America.

Death
Mark Landon was found dead at his West Hollywood home in the 1300 block of North Sweetzer Avenue around noon on May 11, 2009, at age 60. He was interred at the Hillside Memorial Park Cemetery in Culver City, California, in the same crypt as his father.

West Hollywood sheriff's investigators stated that there was no suspicion of foul play.

References

External links

 

1948 births
Place of birth missing
2009 deaths
American male television actors
American people of Jewish descent
Male actors from Greater Los Angeles
Burials at Hillside Memorial Park Cemetery
20th-century American male actors
Michael Landon family